Te Kukupa II is a  built in Australia for the Cook Islands.  It replaced the original , supplied to the Cook Islands three decades earlier.  Her crew is drawn from the Cook Islands Police Service.

Design

Australia designed the vessels to use commercial off the shelf components, rather than cutting edge military grade components, to make it easier to maintain the vessels in small, isolated shipyards. They are able to launch and retrieve a pursuit boat from a stern launching ramp without requiring bringing the vessel to a halt.

Operational history
Te Kukupa II was launched in January 2022. It was formally handed over to the Cook Islands at a ceremony on 9 June 2022, and arrived in Rarotonga on 20 July 2022.

In August 2022 it transported covid-19 vaccines to Palmerston Island.

References

2022 ships
Ships of the Cook Islands
Guardian class patrol vessels
Ships built by Austal